The 2010 CECAFA U-20 Championship is an association football competition that was held between 14 and 28 August 2010. Eritrea hosted the tournament for the first time in the country's history.

Participants

Group A

Group B

Fixtures

Group stage

Group A

Group B

NOTE: Zanzibar win over Yemen was forfeited as a result of over age player.

Semi final

Third place playoff

Final

References

U-20 Championship
Cecafa U-20 Championship